A prosumer is an individual who both consumes and produces. The term is a portmanteau of the words producer and consumer. Research has identified six types of prosumers: DIY prosumers, self-service prosumers, customizing prosumers, collaborative prosumers, monetised prosumers, and economic prosumers.

The terms prosumer and prosumption were coined in 1980 by American futurist Alvin Toffler, and were widely used by many technology writers of the time. Technological breakthrough and a rise in user participation blurs the line between production and consumption activities, with the consumer becoming a prosumer.

Definitions and contexts

Prosumers have been defined as "individuals who consume and produce value, either for self-consumption or consumption by others, and can receive implicit or explicit incentives from organizations involved in the exchange."

The term has since come to refer to a person using commons-based peer production.

In the digital and online world, ”prosumer” is used to describe 21st-century online buyers because not only are they consumers of products, but they are able to produce their own products such as, customised handbags, jewellery with initials, jumpers with team logos etc.

In the field of renewable energy, prosumers are households or organisations which at times produce surplus fuel or energy and feed it into a national (or local) distribution network; whilst at other times (when their fuel or energy requirements outstrip their own production of it) they consume that same fuel or energy from that grid. This is widely done by households by means of PV panels on their roofs generating electricity. Such households may additionally make use of battery storage to increase their share of self-consumed PV electricity, referred to as prosumage in the literature. It is also done by businesses which produce biogas and feed it into a gas network while using gas from the same network at other times or in other places. The European Union's Nobel Grid project, which is part of their Horizon 2020 research and innovation programme, uses the term in this way, for example.

The sharing economy is another context where individuals can act as prosumers. For example, in the sharing economy, individuals can be providers (e.g., Airbnb hosts, Uber drivers) and consumers (e.g., Airbnb guests, Uber passengers). Prosumers are one avenue to grow the sharing economy.

Scholars have connected prosumer culture to the concept of McDonaldization, as advanced by sociologist George Ritzer.  Referring to the business model of McDonald's, which has emphasized efficiency for management while getting customers to invest more effort and time themselves (such as by cleaning up after themselves in restaurants), McDonaldization gets prosumers to perform more work without paying them for their labor.

Origins and development 
The blurring of the roles of consumers and producers has its origins in the cooperative self-help movements that sprang up during various economic crises, e.g. the Great Depression of the 1930s. Marshall McLuhan and Barrington Nevitt suggested in their 1972 book Take Today, (p. 4) that with electric technology, the consumer would become a producer. In the 1980 book, The Third Wave, futurologist Alvin Toffler coined the term "prosumer" when he predicted that the role of producers and consumers would begin to blur and merge (even though he described it in his book Future Shock from 1970). Toffler envisioned a highly saturated marketplace as mass production of standardized products began to satisfy basic consumer demands. To continue growing profit, businesses would initiate a process of mass customization, that is the mass production of highly customized products.

However, to reach a high degree of customization, consumers would have to take part in the production process especially in specifying design requirements. In a sense, this is merely an extension or broadening of the kind of relationship that many affluent clients have had with professionals like architects for many decades. However, in many cases architectural clients are not the only or even primary end-consumers.

Toffler has extended these and many other ideas well into the 21st-century. Along with more recently published works such as Revolutionary Wealth (2006),  one can recognize and assess both the concept and fact of the prosumer as it is seen and felt on a worldwide scale. That these concepts are having global impact and reach, however, can be measured in part by noting in particular, Toffler's popularity in China. Discussing some of these issues with Newt Gingrich on C-SPAN's After Words program in June 2006, Toffler mentioned that The Third Wave is the second ranked bestseller of all time in China, just behind a work by Mao Zedong.

Don Tapscott reintroduced the concept in his 1995 book The Digital Economy., and his 2006 book Wikinomics: How Mass Collaboration Changes Everything with Anthony D. Williams. George Ritzer and Nathan Jurgenson, in a widely cited article, claimed that prosumption had become a salient characteristic of Web 2.0. Prosumers create value for companies without receiving wages.

Toffler's Prosumption was well described and expanded in economic terms by Philip Kotler, who saw them as a new challenge for marketers. Kotler anticipated that people will also want to play larger role in designing certain goods and services they consume, furthermore modern computers will permit them to do it. He also described several forces that would lead to more prosumption like activities, and to more sustainable lifestyles, that topic was further developed by Tomasz Szymusiak in 2013 and 2015 in two marketing books.

Technological breakthrough has fastened the development of prosumption. With the help of additive manufacturing techniques, for example, co-creation takes place at different production stages: design, manufacturing and distribution stages. It also takes place between individual customers, leading to co-design communities. Similarly, mass customisation is often associated with the production of tailored goods or services on a large scale production. This increase in participation has flourished following the increasing popularity of Web 2.0 technologies, such as Instagram, Facebook, Twitter and Flickr.

In July 2020, an academic description reported on the nature and rise of the "robot prosumer", derived from modern-day technology and related participatory culture, that, in turn, was substantially predicted earlier by science fiction writers.

Criticism 
Prosumer capitalism has been criticized as promoting "new forms of exploitation through unpaid work gamified as fun".

Examples 

Identifiable trends and movements outside of the mainstream economy that have adopted prosumer terminology and techniques include:
a Do It Yourself (DIY) approach as a means of economic self-sufficiency or simply as a way to survive on diminished income
the open source software movement creates software on their own, prime example is the successful operating system Linux which now dominates the server domain
Fablab movement, self-fabrication capabilities especially 3d printing
the voluntary simplicity movement that seeks personal, social, and environmental goals through prosumer activities such as:
growing one's own food
repairing clothing and appliances rather than buying new items
playing musical instruments rather than listening to recorded music
use of new media-creation and distribution technologies to foster independent, open, non-profit, "consumer-to-consumer" media and cultures (see Wikipedia, Indymedia, most of Creative Commons); many involved in independent media reject mass culture generated by concentrated corporate media
self-sufficient barter networks, notably in developing nations, such as Argentina's RGT have adopted the term prosumer4

See also
Cost the limit of price
Creative consumer
Participatory culture
Power user
Produsage
Read/write culture

Notes

References
 Chen, Katherine K. (April 2012). "Artistic Prosumption: Cocreative Destruction at Burning Man." American Behavioral Scientist Vol. 56, No. 4, 570-595. 
 Kotler, Philip. (1986). Prosumers: A New Type of Customer. Futurist(September–October), 24-28.
 Kotler, Philip. (1986). The Prosumer Movement. A New Challenge for Marketers. Advances in Consumer Research, 13, 510-513.
 Lui, K.M. and Chan, K.C.C. (2008) Software Development Rhythms: Harmonizing Agile Practices for Synergy, John Wiley and Sons, 
 Michel, Stefan. (1997). Prosuming-Marketing. Konzeption und Anwendung. Bern; Stuttgart;Wien: Haupt.
 Nakajima, Seio. (April 2012). "Prosumption in Art." American Behavioral Scientist Vol. 56, No. 4, 550–569. 
 Ritzer, G. & Jurgenson, N., 2010. Production, Consumption, Prosumption. Journal of Consumer Culture, 10 (1), pp. 13 –36. 
 Toffler, Alvin. (1980). The third wave: The classic study of tomorrow. New York, NY: Bantam.
 Xie, Chunyan, & Bagozzi, Richard P. (2008). Trying to Prosume: Toward a Theory of Consumers as Co-Creators of Value. Journal of the Academy of Marketing Science, 36 (1), 109-122.
 Szymusiak T., (2013). Social and economic benefits of Prosumption and Lead User Phenomenon in Germany - Lessons for Poland [in:] Sustainability Innovation, Research Commercialization and Sustainability Marketing, Sustainability Solutions, München. 
 Szymusiak T., (2015). Prosumer – Prosumption – Prosumerism, OmniScriptum GmbH & Co. KG, Düsseldorf.

External links

 Turns of Phrase: Prosumer - business-oriented definitions of producer/professional and consumer

Market (economics)
Consumer behaviour
1980 neologisms